Rubus pectinellus, commonly known as atibulnak, is a species of brambles in the rose family. It is native to Japan, southern China, Taiwan, and the Philippines. It is also known as kobanofuyuichigo (コバノフユイチゴ) in Japanese and  huáng pào (黄泡) in Mandarin Chinese. Atibulnak fruits are edible, either raw or cooked, and have a pleasant subacid flavor. The leaves are also eaten as a vegetable in the Philippines.

The leaves are either heart-shaped or with three lobes and have a rough and hairy texture with serrated margins. They are borne alternate on the stems. Both the leaves and the stems are covered with small spines.

References

External links
 
 

pectinellus
Berries
Plants described in 1872
Flora of the Philippines
Flora of Japan
Flora of China
Flora of Taiwan